Shit (also Romanized as Sheet; also known as Chihi, Chin, Posht, and Shīd) is a village in Chavarzaq Rural District of Chavarzaq District of Tarom County, Zanjan province, Iran. At the 2006 National Census, its population was 804 in 192 households. The following census in 2011 counted 899 people in 235 households. The latest census in 2016 showed a population of 896 people in 284 households; it was the largest village in its rural district.

The village is nearly 500 years old and has been declared a special tourism area of Zanjan province and Tarom County.

References 

Tarom County

Populated places in Zanjan Province

Populated places in Tarom County